Lee Ho-lim (also Lee Ho-rim, ; born July 22, 1988 in Seoul) is a South Korean sport shooter. She won a gold medal in the women's air pistol at the 2005 ISSF World Cup in Milan, Italy, accumulating a score of 485.9 targets. She also captured a bronze medal for the women's 25 m sport pistol at the 2010 Asian Games in Guangzhou, China, with a score of 782.4 points.

Lee represented South Korea at the 2008 Summer Olympics in Beijing, where she competed in two pistol shooting events. She placed twenty-first out of forty-four shooters in the women's 10 m air pistol, with a total score of 380 points. Three days later, Lee competed for her second event, 25 m pistol, where she was able to shoot 289 targets in the precision stage, and 291 in the rapid fire, for a total score of 580 points, finishing only in seventeenth place.

References

External links
NBC 2008 Olympics profile

South Korean female sport shooters
Living people
Olympic shooters of South Korea
Shooters at the 2008 Summer Olympics
Asian Games medalists in shooting
1988 births
Shooters at the 2006 Asian Games
Shooters at the 2010 Asian Games
Asian Games gold medalists for South Korea
Asian Games bronze medalists for South Korea
Medalists at the 2006 Asian Games
Medalists at the 2010 Asian Games
20th-century South Korean women
21st-century South Korean women